John L. Younker (November 16, 1836 – May 18, 1911) was an American soldier who fought in the American Civil War. Younker received his country's highest award for bravery during combat, the Medal of Honor. Younker's medal was won for his heroism at the Battle of Cedar Mountain in Virginia on August 9, 1862. He was honored with the award on November 1, 1893.

Younker was born in Württemberg, Germany. He joined the Army from Lancaster, Ohio in March 1862, and was discharged in March 1865. He is buried in Logan, Ohio.

Medal of Honor citation

See also
List of American Civil War Medal of Honor recipients: T–Z

References

1836 births
1911 deaths
American Civil War recipients of the Medal of Honor
German emigrants to the United States
German-born Medal of Honor recipients
People from the Kingdom of Württemberg
People of Ohio in the American Civil War
Union Army soldiers
United States Army Medal of Honor recipients
Military personnel from Baden-Württemberg